Mazandaran Mahalleh or Mazanderan Mahalleh may refer to:
 Mazandaran Mahalleh, Gilan
 Mazandaran Mahalleh-ye Bahambar, Gilan Province
 Mazandaran Mahalleh Beham Bar, alternate name of Jirsar-e Bahambar, Gilan Province
 Mazandaran Mahalleh, Mazandaran